Bagnoli is a western seaside quarter of Naples, Italy.

Bagnoli may also refer to:

Places in Italy
Bagnoli, Arcidosso, a hamlet of Arcidosso, in the Province of Grosseto
Bagnoli della Rosandra, a hamlet of San Dorligo della Valle, in the Province of Trieste
Bagnoli del Trigno, a municipality of the Province of Isernia
Bagnoli di Sopra, a municipality of the Province of Padua
Bagnoli Irpino, a municipality of the Province of Avellino

People
Al Bagnoli (born 1953), American football coach
Antonio Bagnoli (1902–1997), Italian ordinary of the Catholic Church
Daniele Bagnoli (born 1953), Italian volleyball coach
Giovanni Francesco Bagnoli (1678–1713), Italian painter
Martina Bagnoli] (born 1964), Italian art historian and curator
Osvaldo Bagnoli (born 1935), former Italian football coach
Simone Bagnoli (born 1981), Italian professional basketball player
Stefano Bagnoli, Italian jazz drummer

See also
Bagnolo (disambiguation)